Hugh Wilson (5 August 1859 – 14 December 1946) was a Scottish international footballer who played for Dumbarton in the 1880s.

He began his career at hometown club Mauchline and was playing for them in 1878 when they won the Ayrshire Cup, and represented the county in several of the regional challenge matches which were played in that era against the likes of Edinburgh and Birmingham. He moved to Dumbarton in 1884.

Wilson was capped once by Scotland when he played against Wales on 23 March 1885. He was included in the team as a late replacement for his Dumbarton colleague Leitch Keir, with the appearance wrongly attributed to Keir in most reference books for several decades afterwards.

References

1859 births
1946 deaths
Scottish footballers
Scotland international footballers
Dumbarton F.C. players
Association football defenders
Footballers from East Ayrshire
People from Mauchline